François Henry Spoerry (28 December 1912 – 11 January 1999) was a French architect, developer, and urban planner  that created the seaside town of Port Grimaud. He was an Officier of the Légion d'honneur and an Officier of the Ordre des Arts et des Lettres.

Early years
He was born in Mulhouse to a large, industrious family that had moved from Switzerland to Mulhouse in 1848 to start up a textile business. The family had a holiday home at Partigon. His parents were Henry Spoerry (1879–1966) and Jeanne Schlumberger. 
Spoerry had three younger sisters:  Anne-Marie, a physician, aviator and adventurer, Therese, and Martine.

After finishing school, Spoerry studied architecture at the École des Beaux-Arts, Strasbourg in 1930.  He became an assistant to Jacques Couëlle during the period of 1932 through 1934.  He graduated from Marseille's École des Beaux-Arts in 1943 .

During World War II, he used an architectural research project in Aix-en-Provence as a cover for working with the French Resistance. In April 1943, he was arrested and deported to Buchenwald and then Dachau.

Career

After the war ended, he opened his first architectural firm in Mulhouse where he associated with a significant number of reconstruction projects. In Mulhouse, he was the planner of the new town centre.  He also built in Mulhouse the Tour of Europe, the largest structure in contemporary France whose top floor was a revolving restaurant. He also built several residential structures, including  Wilson Tower (highest building in the city after the Tour of Europe), the Residence Clemenceau. Residence Pierrefontaine, and others. What is most significance about the work of Spoerry is that he broke with the first principles of Planning CIAM while rediscovering the principles of a dense urbanism.  He built and developed several mixed-use, neo-traditional, developments in Europe and North America.

At the end of the 1980s, he was known as a member of Amiic (World Real Estate Investment Organization, Geneva) and was a lecturer, with Jean-Pierre Thiollet and other important people, of some international meetings of this organization (which was dissolved in 1997).

He is associated with the European Urban Renaissance movement. He was an advocate of "vernacular architecture". Spoerry is the author of A gentle architecture, from Port-Grimaud to Port-Liberté, published in 1991.

Apart from the creation of Port Grimaud in Var, Spoerry's major works in France include:
 district of Cergy-Pontoise
 development of the Tour Perret in Amiens, built by Auguste Perret, in
 Tour de l'Europe, in Mulhouse
 center of the city of Le Plessis-Robinson
 New village of Gassin

Outside France his major works were:

 Puerto Escondido, Baja California Sur, Mexico
 neighborhood of Port Liberté, Jersey City, New Jersey
 district of Porto Cervo in Sardinia
 district of Port Louis in Louisiana
 village of Bendinat in Majorca, Spain
 Saifi Village, Beirut

Personal life
On 27 October 1945, Spoerry married Joy Pierrette Besse (1923–1952). Spoerry and his wife had two sons, Yves and Bernard.

His father-in-law, Antonin Besse, was a wealthy merchant with businesses in Aden and Beirut.  Also a philanthropist, Antonin founded St Antony's College, Oxford, and saved Gordonstoun in Moray, Scotland from closure.

Spoerry was an avid sailor, owning the schooner Amphitrite between 1966 and 1969.  He died at his home in Port Grimaud in 1999 and is buried at the church in Port Grimaud.

References

 "Une ville qui réduirait la violence" avec Paul Léauté, 1980, in Sécurité et liberté, La Documentation française (French)
 L'Architecture douce, 1977, Édition Robert Laffont (French)

1912 births
1999 deaths
Officiers of the Légion d'honneur
Officiers of the Ordre des Arts et des Lettres
French Resistance members
People from Mulhouse
École des Beaux-Arts alumni
20th-century French architects
New Classical architects